Bifrenaria silvana is a species of orchid.

silvana
Plants described in 1991